Gianluca Claudio Pandeynuwu (born 9 November 1997) is an Indonesian professional footballer who plays as a goalkeeper for Liga 1 club Persis Solo.

Club career

Borneo FC
He was signed for Borneo to play in Indonesia Soccer Championship A in 2016. Pandeynuwu made his first-team debut on 17 November 2018 in a match against Perseru Serui at the Marora Stadium, Yapen.

PSPS Pekanbaru (loan)
In 2017, he joined PSPS Pekanbaru in the 2017 Liga 2 as a loan, and he was called to the Indonesia U-19.

Persis Solo
Pandeynuwu was signed for Persis Solo to play in Liga 1 in the 2022–23 season. He made his league debut on 29 September 2022 in a match against PSM Makassar at the Manahan Stadium, Surakarta.

Career statistics

Club

References

External links
 Gianluca Pandeynuwu at Website ISC
 Gianluca Pandeynuwu at Liga Indonesia

1997 births
Living people
People from Tomohon
Indonesian footballers
PSPS Pekanbaru players
Borneo F.C. players
Persis Solo players
Liga 2 (Indonesia) players
Liga 1 (Indonesia) players
Sportspeople from North Sulawesi
Association football goalkeepers
21st-century Indonesian people